Netaji Subhash Chandra Bose Road is an important road in South Kolkata that runs in a north-west to south-east direction. It connects the localities of Tollygunge in the north-west and Rajpur Sonarpur in the south through Garia.

The road is narrow, but given its significance it carries a considerable amount of traffic throughout the day.

Localities
Netaji Subhash Chandra Bose Road (or N.S.C. Bose Road) starts from the Tollygunge Tram Depot crossing and passes through the localities of Ashoknagar, Ranikuthi, Netaji Nagar, Bansdroni and Naktala and touches Raja SC Mullick Road at Garia and from there passes through Rajpur Sonarpur touching the localities of Garia, Narendrapur, Harinavi up to the southern fringes of South Kolkata. It runs nearly parallel to the Tolly's Nullah all along from Bansdroni.

Most of the localities along this road were former refugee colonies, for the huge number of people who had to migrate from erstwhile East Bengal (now Bangladesh) after the partition of Bengal in 1947.

To ease the amount of traffic and congestion on this road, the Kolkata Metro's south extension to Garia opened in 2009. The metro tracks run parallel to this road on the Tolly's Nullah and has the following stations:

 Netaji (Kudghat)
 Masterda Surya Sen (Bansdroni)
 Gitanjali (Naktala)
 Kavi Nazrul (Garia Bazaar)

Landmarks

There are quite a few important landmarks on this road, such as:
 The Indrapuri Film Studios
 The ITC Sangeet Research Academy
 The Assembly Of God Church School (Tollygunj branch)
 Sri Aurobindo Institute of Culture
 Swetamber Gujarati Jain Temple at N.S.C. Bose Road
 Naktala High School
 Bansdroni Supermarket
 Malancha Cinema
 BSNL Telephone Exchange near Ranikuthi
 The Tolly Residency
 Garia Bus Stand area
 Garia Shitala Mandir
 Hindusthan More
 Mahamayatala, Garia
 B.D.M. International School at Kamalgazi, Kolkata
 Wood Square Mall, Narendrapur, Kolkata
 Ramakrishna Mission, Narendrapur, Kolkata

Transportation
The various modes of transportation available along this road are private buses (80A, 205, 205A, 228, SD5, S6A, S7, S55, AC6, C49 etc.) and also mini buses (Naktala-Howrah, Harinavi-Howrah). Another major mode of transportation popular in this area are three-wheelers better known as auto-rickshaws. Cycle-rickshaws are abundant in this area as well, apart from the multitude of taxis and private vehicles traveling in the area.

Due to this multitude of traffic, traffic jams are part of a daily routine, especially in places like the Rajpur Bazar, Kamalgazi Crossing, Garia crossing, Usha Gate crossing, Bansdroni and the other popular crossings like Netaji Nagar, Ranikuthi and Malancha-More Road crossing.

See also
 Streets in Kolkata

External links
 Sri Aurobindo Institute of Culture
 ITC Sangeet Research Academy
 Naktala High School

Roads in Kolkata
Memorials to Subhas Chandra Bose